A Dead Man Cannot Live is a 2021 Spanish action thriller film directed and written by Ezekiel Montes. The cast, led by Antonio Dechent, also features Rubén Ochandiano, Elena Martínez, Jesús Castro, Paco Tous, Nancho Novo and Manuel de Blas.

Plot 
The film is set in the Costa del Sol, featuring real-estate corruption as a backdrop. The plot follows Tano, the henchman of Manuel, a real-estate businessman who has got too old. The ways of Ángel, Manuel's son and heir-apparent, complicate things.

Cast

Production 
A Dead Man Cannot Live is Ezekiel Montes' debut feature film. He took over direction, cinematography, production and script development duties. Filming began in Málaga on 11 November 2019. Other shooting locations also included Marbella and Cádiz. The film was produced by 73140323 PC alongside CineAND Distribución.

Release 
The film premiered at the 24th Málaga Spanish Film Festival (FCME) on 8 June 2021. Distributed by Filmax, the film was theatrically released in Spain on 2 July 2021.

Reception 
Alberto Luchini of Metrópoli gave the film 2.5 out of 5 stars, considering that despite a number of positive points, such as Dechent's great performance, those of Elena Martínez and Nancho Novo, the well-done atmosphere, the notable cinematography and the staging, the screenplay was "sheer nonsense".

Sergio F. Pinilla of Cinemanía gave the film 3 out of 5 stars, deeming it to be a hyperviolent action thriller with a "colossal cast", and a "somewhat confusing narrative".

Federico Marín Bellón of ABC gave the film, which features "uncomfortable violence", 2 out of 5 stars. He considered that, top-rate cast notwithstanding, a "disjointed choreography of gunpowder" is eventually unleashed in the film, "upon which narrative and editing failures are accentuated".

Carmen L. Lobo of La Razón gave the film 3 out of 5 stars, writing that it is "a wild film with some stereotypes and script weaknesses thrown in but it keeps you gripped throughout".

Awards and nominations 

|-
| align = "center" | 2021 || 34th ASECAN Awards || Best Actor || Antonio Dechent ||  || 
|-
| align = "center" rowspan = "11" | 2022 || rowspan = "11" | 1st Carmen Awards || Best Actor || Antonio Dechent ||  || rowspan = "11" | 
|-
| Best Original Song || Chelo Soto || 
|-
| Best New Director || Ezekiel Montes || 
|-
| Best Special Effects || Eduardo Pérez, Juan Ventura, Víctor Alcalá || 
|-
| Best New Actress || Elena Martínez || 
|-
| Best Editing || José. M. G. Moyano || 
|-
| Best Cinematography || Ezekiel Montes || 
|-
| Best Supporting Actor || Paco Tous || 
|}

See also 
 List of Spanish films of 2021

References

External links 
 A Dead Man Cannot Live at ICAA's Catálogo de Cinespañol

Spanish action thriller films
2020s Spanish-language films
2021 films
Films set in Andalusia
2021 action thriller films
Films shot in the province of Málaga
Films shot in the province of Cádiz
2020s Spanish films